Leslie Jones is an American film editor.

Biography
Jones is the daughter of film editor Robert C. Jones and the granddaughter of editor Harmon Jones, each of whom has been nominated for an Academy Award for editing. Jones was the assistant editor for her father on two films, See No Evil, Hear No Evil and The Babe. She has several editing credits for independent films and documentaries, and was the associate editor on Grumpier Old Men. Her first editing credit on a major studio film was for Murder at 1600, which she co-edited with Billy Weber. Jones, Weber and Saar Klein were widely recognized for the film The Thin Red Line. They were nominated for an Academy Award, an American Cinema Editors Eddie Award and a Satellite Award. Jones has also collaborated with Paul Thomas Anderson on several films. She was nominated for an Eddie Award.

Filmography
Ballad of Tina Juarez
Angel Fire
Wild Bill: Hollywood Maverick
Murder at 1600 (1997)
The Thin Red Line (1998)
Woman on Top (2000)
CQ (2001)
Punch-Drunk Love (2002)
Starsky & Hutch (2004)
School for Scoundrels (2006)
The Vampire's Assistant (2009)
Little Fockers (2010)
The Master (2012)
In Secret (2013)
Inherent Vice (2014)
20th Century Women (2016)
Rules Don't Apply (2016)
Come from Away (2021)
Dog (2022)

References

Further reading

External links

Year of birth missing (living people)
Living people
American film editors
American women film editors
American Cinema Editors
Place of birth missing (living people)
21st-century American women